The 2002–03 Western Kentucky Hilltoppers men's basketball team represented Western Kentucky University during the 2002–03 NCAA Division I men's basketball season. The Hilltoppers were led by head coach Dennis Felton and All Sun Belt Conference forward, David Boyden. They finished 1st in the SBC East Division and won the conference tournament and automatic bid to the 2003 NCAA Division I men's basketball tournament.  Joining Boyden on the All SBC team was Mike Wells and Patrick Sparks, as well as SBC Freshman of the Year, Anthony Winchester.   Boyden and Wells also made the SBC All-Tournament team and Sparks was tournament MVP.

Schedule

|-
!colspan=6| Regular Season
 
|-

|-
!colspan=6| 2003 Sun Belt Conference men's basketball tournament

|-
!colspan=6| 2003 NCAA Division I men's basketball tournament

References

Western Kentucky
Western Kentucky Hilltoppers basketball seasons
Western Kentucky
Western Kentucky Basketball, Men's
Western Kentucky Basketball, Men's